Solinus may refer to:

 Gaius Julius Solinus, a 3rd century Latin author
 Solinus (horse), a British racehorse (1975–1979)
 Solinus, Duke of Ephesus, a character in William Shakespeare's play The Comedy of Errors

See also
 Salinas (disambiguation)

Latin masculine given names